This is a list of aircraft which are classified as having Short Takeoff and Landing, or STOL, characteristics.

The STOL class excludes vertical takeoff and landing (VTOL) types, rotorcraft, aerostats and most light aircraft.



List of aircraft

!Type
!Country
!Date
!Role
!Status
!data-sort-type=number|Take-off to 50 ft (15 m)
!data-sort-type=number|Landing from 50 ft (15 m)
!class=unsortable|Notes
|-
|AAC Angel
| US
| 1984
| Utility
| Production
|
|
|
|-
|Aircraft Industries L 410 NG
|Czech Republic
|2015
|Utility
|Production
|
|
|
|-
| Antonov An-14
| Soviet Union
| 1958
| Transport
| Production
|
|
|
|-
| Antonov An-72
| Soviet Union
| 1977
| Transport
| Production
|
|
|
|-
| Auster AOP.9
| UK
| 1954
| Artillery observer
| Production
|
|
|
|-
| Australian Aircraft Kits Hornet STOL
| Australia
| 2004
| Ultralight
| Production
| 
| 
|
|-
| Bounsall Super Prospector
| US
| 1990
| Homebuilt
| Production
|
|
|
|-
|Boeing YC-14
|US
|1976
|Transport
|Prototype (Cancelled)
|
|
|
|-
| Britten-Norman Defender
| UK
| 1970
| Transport
| Production
|
|
|
|-
| Boeing/NASA C-8A AWJSRA
| US
| 1972
| Jet flap STOL research
| Production
|
|
|Augmented Wing Jet-flap STOL Research Aircraft
|-
| Britten-Norman Islander
| UK
| 1965
| Airliner
| Production
|
|
|
|-
| CASA C-212 Aviocar
| Spain
| 1974
| Transport
| Production
|
|
| Airliner, cargo and ground attack variants
|-
| Conroy Stolifter
| US
| 1968
| Utility
| Prototype
|
|
| Converted Cessna Skymaster.
|-
| De Havilland Canada DHC-2 Beaver Mk 1
| Canada
| 1947
| Transport
| Production
|
|
|
|-
| De Havilland Canada DHC-2 Beaver Mk III
| Canada
| 1947
| Transport
| Production
|
|
|
|-
| De Havilland Canada DHC-3 Otter
| Canada
| 1951
| Transport
| Production
|
|
|
|-
| De Havilland Canada DHC-4 Caribou
| Canada
| 1959
| Transport
| Production
|
|
|
|-
| De Havilland Canada DHC-5 Buffalo
| Canada
| 1965
| Utility
| Production
|
|
|
|-
| De Havilland Canada DHC-6 Twin Otter
| Canada
| 1966
| Utility
| Production
|
|
|
|-
| De Havilland Canada Dash 7
| Canada
| 1975
| Airliner
| Production
|
|
|
|-
| Dornier Do 27
| Germany
| 1955
| Utility
| Production
|
|
|
|-
| Dornier Do 28
| Germany
| 1959
| Utility
| Production
|
|
|
|-
| Dornier Do 29
| Germany
| 1958
| Utility
| Prototype / research
|
|
|
|-
| Dornier P.360
| Germany
| 1967
| Military transport aircraft
| Prototype / research
|
|
|Similar to Armstrong Whitworth AW.681
|-
| Evangel 4500
| US
| 1964
| Transport
| Production
|
|
|
|-
| Fieseler Fi 156 Storch
| Germany
| 1936
| Utility
| Production
| 
| 
|
|-
| Helio Courier H-295
| US
| 1955
| Utility
| Production
|
|
| "Helioplane #1" demonstrator first flew 1949
|-
| IAI Arava
| Israel
| 1972
| Transport
| Production
|
|
|
|-
| Javelin V6 STOL
| US
| 1949
| Homebuilt
| Production
|
|
| Piper PA-20 Pacer conversion.
|-
| Just Superstol
| US
| 2012
| Homebuilt
| Production
|
|
| 
|-
|Let L-410 Turbolet 
|Czech Republic
|1969
|Utility
|Production
|
|
|
|-
| Maule M-5
| US
| 1974
| Utility
| Production
|
|
|
|-
|McDonnell Douglas YC-15
|US
|1975
|Transport
|Prototype (Cancelled)
|
|
|
|-
| Murphy Radical
| Canada
| 2016
| Utility
| Production
|
|
|
|-
|NAL Quiet STOL research aircraft ASKA
|Japan
|1985
|Research
|Prototype
|
|
|
|-
| NASA Quiet Short-Haul Research Aircraft
| US
| 1974
| Research
| Prototype
|
|
|
|-
| PAC P-750 XSTOL
| New Zealand
| 2001
| Utility
| Production
|
|
|
|-
| Peterson 260SE/Wren 460
| US
| 1988
| Utility
| Production
|
|
| Conversion of Cessna 182.
|-
| Pilatus PC-6 Porter
| Switzerland
| 1959
| Utility
| Production
|
|
|
|-
| Piper J-3 Cub
| US
| 1938
| Utility
| Production
|
|
|
|-
| PZL-104 Wilga
| Poland
| 1962
| Utility
| Production
|
|
|
|-
| PZL-105M
| Poland
| 1989
| Utility
| Prototype
|
|
|
|-
|Quest Kodiak
| US
| 2005
| Transport
| Production
|
|
|
|-
|Scottish Aviation Pioneer
| UK
| 1947
| Transport
| Production
|
|
|
|-
|Scottish Aviation Twin Pioneer
| UK
| 1955
| Transport
| Production
|
|
|
|-
| ShinMaywa US-2
| Japan
| 2007
| Air-Sea Rescue
| Production
|
|
|
|-
| Short SC.7 Skyvan
| UK
| 1963
| Transport
| Production
|
|
|
|-
| SIAI-Marchetti FN.333 Riviera
| Italy
| 1952
| Amphibian
| Production
|
|
|
|-
| SIAI-Marchetti SM.1019
| Italy
| 1969
| Utility
| Production
|
|
|
|-
| Slepcev Storch
| Serbia
| 1994
| Ultralight
| Production
| 
| 
| Scale replica of Fieseler Fi 156 Storch.
|-
| Spectrum SA-550
| US
| 1983
| Transport
| Production
|
|
| Converted Cessna Skymaster.
|-
|Sukhoi Su-80
| Russian Federation
| 2001
| Transport
| Production
|
|
|
|-
|Westland Lysander I
| UK
| 1936
| Army cooperation
| Production
|
|
|
|-
| Zenith STOL CH 701
| US
| 1986
| Trainer
| Production
|
|
|
|-
| Zenith STOL CH 801
| US
| 2011
| Homebuilt
| Production
|
|
|
|}

See also
 List of VTOL aircraft

Notes

References
 Bridgeman, Leonard Jane's All The World's Aircraft 1948. MacMillan, 1948.
 Bridgeman, Leonard Jane's All The World's Aircraft 1959–60. Sampson, Low, Marston and Company, 1959.
 Fillingham, Paul Basic Guide to Flying. New York: Hawthorn, 1975. 
 Jackson, Paul Janes All the Worlds Aircraft 2004–05, Janes Publishing Company, 2004. .
 Lambert, Mark. Jane's All The World's Aircraft 1993–94. Coulsdon, UK:Jane's Data Division, 1993. .
 Taylor, John W.R. Jane's All The World's Aircraft 1971–72. London: Jane's Yearbooks, 1971. .
 Taylor, John W.R. Jane's All The World's Aircraft 1976–77. London: Jane's Yearbooks, 1976. .
 Plane & Pilot: 1978 Aircraft Directory, Werner & Werner Corp, Santa Monica CA, 1977. 

STOL